The 2008 European Junior Swimming Championships were held from July 30 to August 3, 2008 in Belgrade, Serbia. The age groups for this event are girls born in 1992 or 1993 and boys born in 1990 and 1991. The tournament is held in a 50 m pool. All events which are held in senior championships are included in the junior championships, including non-Olympic events.

Medal table

Medal summary

Male events

Female events

See also
2008 in swimming

External links 
Official site (was): www.belgrade2008.org (Note: Website now offline.)
Official Results
Swimstar 2000

J
S
European Junior Swimming Championships
Swimming competitions in Serbia
International sports competitions in Belgrade
2000s in Belgrade
July 2008 sports events in Europe
August 2008 sports events in Europe
Swimming